The 1992–93 season was Mansfield Town's 56th season in the Football League and 2nd in the Second Division they finished in 22nd position with 44 points and were relegated to the Third Division.

Final league table

Results

Football League Second Division

FA Cup

League Cup

League Trophy

Squad statistics
 Squad list sourced from

References
General
 Mansfield Town 1992–93 at soccerbase.com (use drop down list to select relevant season)

Specific

Mansfield Town F.C. seasons
Mansfield Town